Markus Winkelhock (born 13 June 1980) is a German professional racing driver. He is the son of Manfred Winkelhock and nephew of Joachim Winkelhock, both of whom were Formula One drivers in the 1980s. During his brief Formula One career he led the 2007 European Grand Prix for several laps before retiring with mechanical problems. Having switched to sports and touring car racing, he has also won the FIA GT1 World Championship in 2012 with team-mate Marc Basseng.

Early career

Born in Stuttgart, Winkelhock won races in a string of junior formulae including Formula König, German Formula Renault and the Formula Renault Eurocup from 1998 to 2000.

In 2001, Winkelhock joined the German Formula 3 Championship, where he remained until the championship became the F3 Euroseries in 2003. His record was fifth overall in 2001 (three wins), seventh in 2002 (one win) and fourth in 2003 (two wins).

He switched to touring car racing in 2004, with a season in the DTM in an AMG-Mercedes CLK. But he failed to score a point all year with the Persson team.

Winkelhock switched back to single-seater racing in 2005, joining the World Series by Renault with Draco. He won three times but there were also some less than shining moments – notably when he crashed at Monaco in qualifying and on the first lap of the race.

Formula One

On 24 January 2006, Winkelhock was confirmed as a test and reserve driver for the Midland F1 team (formerly Jordan Grand Prix) for the  Formula One season. He participated in Friday test sessions for the team at the Bahrain, Australian, German and Hungarian Grands Prix.

He also made a brief return to the DTM in 2007, starting three races.

Following Christijan Albers's departure from Spyker after the 2007 British Grand Prix, Winkelhock was confirmed as his replacement for the European Grand Prix on 18 July. The deal was only for one race with Sakon Yamamoto set to race for Spyker for the rest of the season.

2007 European Grand Prix

In the race, Winkelhock started last on the 22-car grid alongside teammate Adrian Sutil. On the formation lap, with the rest of the field on dry-weather tyres, the team made a last-second decision to call Winkelhock into the pits to switch to full wet tyres. When pouring rain forced almost all the others to pit at the end of the first lap, Winkelhock was able to move into the lead, passing some cars as they pitted, and even passing Kimi Räikkönen on the track as the Finn tip-toed around to the pits, eventually building a lead of 19 seconds by the end of the second lap. By lap 4 he had a lead of 33 seconds over Ferrari's Felipe Massa in 2nd place.

As the rain got heavier, the stewards first sent out the safety car and then suspended the race following a series of spins in the first corner behind the safety car. The race restarted after the rain had eased. Winkelhock and his team chose to start on full wet tyres on a drying track in the hope of further showers, as the team expected he would be overtaken by faster cars anyway. The gamble failed and, having restarted the race from the lead, Winkelhock quickly fell down the order. He retired on lap 15 with hydraulic problems that caused a small fire. He had led for a total of six laps.

According to Bob Varsha of the Speed Channel commentary team, Winkelhock is the only driver in Formula One history to start last on the grid and lead the race in his first Grand Prix, and due to the red flag and restart, is also the only driver in Formula One history to start both last and first on the grid in the same Grand Prix.

Despite his performance in the race, the Spyker team opted against giving Winkelhock a drive for the remainder of the 2007 season for sponsorship reasons.

Post-Formula One career

Winkelhock returned to the Deutsche Tourenwagen Masters after he lost his Spyker seat, and has remained in the series, driving for Team Rosberg, for 2008 (12th), 2009 (10th) and 2010 (12th).

In 2011, he competed in the FIA GT1 World Championship for the All-Inkl.com Münnich Motorsport team alongside team boss Marc Basseng driving a Lamborghini. They won the championship the following year, the team having switched to the Mercedes SLS due to a change in the regulations.

Winkelhock was to move with Münnich Motorsport to the World Touring Car Championship for 2013, however he left the team before the start of the season in order to focus on his GT racing commitments, and was replaced by defending champion Robert Huff.

Since 2013, he has more or less settled in the Blancpain Endurance Series and also won the 2017 24 Hours of Nürburgring sportscar race.

He also made a brief DTM comeback midway through the 2021 season with Abt Sportsline, where he replaced Sophia Flörsch for the Nürburgring round due to her Le Mans commitments.

Racing record

Career summary

† As Winkelhock was a guest driver, he was ineligible for points.
* Season still in progress.

Complete Formula 3 Euro Series results
(key) (Races in bold indicate pole position) (Races in italics indicate fastest lap)

Complete Formula Renault 3.5 Series results
(key) (Races in bold indicate pole position) (Races in italics indicate fastest lap)

Complete Formula One results
(key)

Complete Deutsche Tourenwagen Masters results
(key) (Races in bold indicate pole position) (Races in italics indicate fastest lap)

† - Driver did not finish, but completed 90% of the race distance.
‡ - Shanghai was a non-championship round.

Complete GT1 World Championship results

Complete FIA GT Series results

‡ — Guest driver – Not eligible for points.

Complete GT World Challenge Europe Sprint Cup results

† Winkelhock was ineligible to score points during the Moscow weekend due to Nikolaus Mayr-Melnhof's absence.

Complete FIA World Rallycross Championship results

Supercar

Complete IMSA SportsCar Championship results
(key) (Races in bold indicate pole position; races in italics indicate fastest lap)

† Winkelhock did not complete sufficient laps in order to score full points.

References

External links

Official website
Markus Winkelhock's career statistics at Driver Database
Who's Who: Markus Winkelhock at F1Fanatic

1980 births
Living people
Sportspeople from Stuttgart
German racing drivers
German Formula One drivers
Spyker Formula One drivers
Italian Formula Renault 2.0 drivers
German Formula Renault 2.0 drivers
Deutsche Tourenwagen Masters drivers
German Formula Three Championship drivers
Formula 3 Euro Series drivers
World Series Formula V8 3.5 drivers
FIA GT1 World Championship drivers
Racing drivers from Baden-Württemberg
Porsche Supercup drivers
24 Hours of Daytona drivers
Rolex Sports Car Series drivers
Blancpain Endurance Series drivers
ADAC GT Masters drivers
WeatherTech SportsCar Championship drivers
24 Hours of Spa drivers
World Rallycross Championship drivers
24H Series drivers
Audi Sport drivers
Walter Lechner Racing drivers
Mücke Motorsport drivers
Draco Racing drivers
Abt Sportsline drivers
Kolles Racing drivers
Team Rosberg drivers
W Racing Team drivers
Phoenix Racing drivers
Mercedes-AMG Motorsport drivers
United Autosports drivers
G-Drive Racing drivers
Nürburgring 24 Hours drivers
Saintéloc Racing drivers